Caladenia arenaria, commonly known as the sand-hill spider orchid, is a plant in the orchid family Orchidaceae and is endemic to New South Wales. It is a ground orchid with a single, densely hairy leaf and one or two white or pale yellow flowers with maroon tips. Formerly much more widespread, it is now only known from about two thousand individual plants in five locations in the Riverina area and is classed as "Endangered".

Description
Caladenia arenaria is a terrestrial, perennial, deciduous, herb with a single underground tuber which is replaced annually.

There are four to six rows of calli, shaped like golf stick heads on the centre of the labellum. Flowering occurs from late August to November.

Taxonomy and naming
Caladenia arenaria was first formally described by Robert FitzGerald in 1882 and the description was published in his book, Australian Orchids. The specific epithet (arenaria) is a Latin word meaning "sandy".

Distribution and habitat
Sand-hill spider orchid grows in sclerophyll forest and on sandhills, usually under cypress pine trees.

Conservation
Caladenia arenaria is listed as "Endangered" under the New South Wales Threatened Species Conservation Act and under the Commonwealth Government Environment Protection and Biodiversity Conservation Act 1999 (EPBC) Act. Five populations with a total of about two thousand individual plants are known. Weeds, grazing and hybridisation with other orchid species are the main threats to the survival of this species.

References

arenaria
Plants described in 1882
Endemic orchids of Australia
Orchids of New South Wales
Taxa named by Robert D. FitzGerald